Loum or LOUM may refer to:
 Lao Loum, an ethnic group of Laos
 A surname in West Africa among the Serer people
 LOUM (Laboratorio de Optica Murcia), a major optics research centre
 Loum, Cameroon
 Battle of Loum, a fictional space battle of the One Year War in the Mobile Suit Gundam series

See also 
 Loom, a device used for weaving
 Lum (disambiguation)